Elaphoidella slovenica is a species of harpacticoid copepod in the family Canthocamptidae. It is found in Europe.

References

Harpacticoida
Articles created by Qbugbot
Crustaceans described in 2007